Robert Dawn (October 22, 1921 – July 9, 1983) was an American make-up artist.

Dawn was born in Hollywood, California, the son of Anna Christine and Jack Dawn, a make-up artist. Dawn attended Commerce High School in San Francisco, California. He served as a fighter pilot during World War II earning the Distinguished Flying Cross, Purple Heart and Silver Star. After being discharged from the Air Force, Dawn worked for Metro-Goldwyn-Mayer as a make-up artist. In 1971, he won a Primetime Emmy Award in the category Outstanding Makeup for his work on the television program Mission: Impossible.

Dawn died in July 1983 in Los Angeles, California, at the age of 61.

References

External links 

1921 births
1983 deaths
People from Hollywood, Los Angeles
American make-up artists
Primetime Emmy Award winners
Recipients of the Distinguished Flying Cross (United States)
Purple Heart
Recipients of the Silver Star